The 1992–93 Courage League National Division Three was the sixth full season of rugby union within the third tier of the English league system, currently known as National League 1.  Otley finished the season as champions and were promoted to Courage League Division 2.  Due to RFU changes to the English rugby union league system for the following season because of the introduction of Courage League Division 5, eight teams were relegated into Courage League Division 4.

Participating teams and locations

League table

Sponsorship
National Division Three is part of the Courage Clubs Championship and is sponsored by Courage Brewery.

See also
 English Rugby Union Leagues
 English rugby union system
 Rugby union in England

Notes

References

N3
National League 1 seasons